"Who's That Girl?" is the first single taken from American rapper Eve's second album, Scorpion (2001), released as her fifth US single in February 2001 and as her debut single in Europe. The song peaked at number 47 on the US Billboard Hot 100 and number six in the United Kingdom. VH1 ranked it at number 97 on their "100 Greatest Songs of Hip Hop" list.

Track listings

US 12-inch single
A1. "Who's That Girl?" (main pass) – 4:42
A2. "Who's That Girl?" (main pass radio edit) – 3:31
A3. "Who's That Girl?" (main pass street mix) – 4:18
B1. "Who's That Girl?" (main pass street mix radio edit) – 3:44
B2. "Who's That Girl?" (instrumental) – 4:41

UK CD single
 "Who's That Girl?" (main pass) – 4:42
 "What Ya Want" (featuring Nokio) – 4:21
 "Who's That Girl?" (C.L.A.S. remix) – 4:28
 "Who's That Girl?" (CD-ROM video)

UK 12-inch single
A1. "Who's That Girl?" (main pass) – 4:42
A2. "Who's That Girl?" (instrumental) – 4:41
B1. "What Ya Want" (featuring Nokio) – 4:21

UK cassette single
 "Who's That Girl?" (main pass) – 4:42
 "What Ya Want" (featuring Nokio) – 4:21

European CD single
 "Who's That Girl?" (album version)
 "Who's That Girl?" (C.L.A.S. remix)

European maxi-CD single
 "Who's That Girl?" (album version)
 "Who's That Girl?" (C.L.A.S. remix)
 "Gotta Man"
 "Who's That Girl?" (street mix without horns) – 4:18
 "Who's That Girl?" (video)

Charts

Weekly charts

Year-end charts

Certifications

Release history

References

2001 singles
Eve (rapper) songs
Music videos directed by Diane Martel
Ruff Ryders Entertainment singles
Interscope Records singles
2001 songs
Songs written by Eve (rapper)